Jason Scott Floros (born 24 November 1990) is an Australian former professional cricketer who played for Queensland and for the Brisbane Heat.

Early career
Floros represented the Australian Capital Territory Under-17 and Under-19 cricket teams, and also attended the Australian Institute of Sport. He played in one Test and 12 ODIs for the Australia Under-19 cricket team in the 2008–09 and 2009–10 seasons.

Queensland career
Floros moved from the ACT to Queensland for the 2009–10 season, representing the Queensland Under-19s and Under-23s in the Futures League. He made his List A debut for Queensland against Tasmania in October 2010, scoring six runs on debut batting at number 4. He made his first-class against South Australia in February 2011, scoring 28 and 41 on debut.

2011–12 season
In July 2011, Floros signed with the Sydney Thunder for the 2011–12 Big Bash League.

References

External links

1990 births
Australian cricketers
Living people
Sportspeople from Canberra
Queensland cricketers
Cricketers from the Australian Capital Territory
Sydney Thunder cricketers
Brisbane Heat cricketers